In mathematics, the Thue–Morse sequence, or Prouhet–Thue–Morse sequence, is the binary sequence (an infinite sequence of 0s and 1s) obtained by starting with 0 and successively appending the Boolean complement of the sequence obtained thus far. The first few steps of this procedure yield the strings 0 then 01, 0110, 01101001, 0110100110010110, and so on, which are prefixes of the Thue–Morse sequence. The full sequence begins:

01101001100101101001011001101001.... 

The sequence is named after Axel Thue and Marston Morse.

Definition 
There are several equivalent ways of defining the Thue–Morse sequence.

Direct definition 

To compute the nth element tn, write the number n in binary.  If the number of ones in this binary expansion is odd then tn = 1, if even then tn = 0.  For this reason John H. Conway et al. called numbers n satisfying tn = 1 odious (for odd) numbers and numbers for which tn = 0 evil (for even) numbers. In other words, tn = 0 if n is an evil number and tn = 1 if n is an odious number.

Fast sequence generation 

In pseudo-code form:
def generateSequence(seqLength):
    value = 0
    for n = 0 to seqLength-1 by 1:
        # Note: assumes an even number of bits in the word size, and two's complement arithmetic so that when n == 0, x is odd (e.g. 31 or 63)
        x = indexOfHighestOneBit(n ^ (n - 1))                        
        if ((x & 1) == 0):
            # bit index is even, so toggle value
            value = 1 - value
        yield value
The resulting algorithm takes constant time to generate each sequence element, using only a logarithmic number of bits (constant number of words) of memory.

Recurrence relation 
The Thue–Morse sequence is the sequence tn satisfying the recurrence relation

for all non-negative integers n.

L-system 

The Thue–Morse sequence is a morphic word: it is the output of the following Lindenmayer system:

Characterization using bitwise negation 
The Thue–Morse sequence in the form given above, as a sequence of bits, can be defined recursively using the operation of bitwise negation.
So, the first element is 0.
Then once the first 2n elements have been specified, forming a string s, then the next 2n elements must form the bitwise negation of s.
Now we have defined the first 2n+1 elements, and we recurse.

Spelling out the first few steps in detail:
 We start with 0.
 The bitwise negation of 0 is 1.
 Combining these, the first 2 elements are 01.
 The bitwise negation of 01 is 10.
 Combining these, the first 4 elements are 0110.
 The bitwise negation of 0110 is 1001.
 Combining these, the first 8 elements are 01101001.
 And so on.

So
 T0 = 0.
 T1 = 01.
 T2 = 0110.
 T3 = 01101001.
 T4 = 0110100110010110.
 T5 = 01101001100101101001011001101001.
 T6 = 0110100110010110100101100110100110010110011010010110100110010110.
 And so on.

Infinite product 
The sequence can also be defined by:
 
where tj is the jth element if we start at j = 0.

Properties 
For instance, if , then . The square  appears in  starting at the 16th bit.

The Thue–Morse sequence is a uniformly recurrent word: given any finite string X in the sequence, there is some length nX (often much longer than the length of X) such that X appears in every block of length nX. Notably, the Thue-Morse sequence is uniformly recurrent without being either periodic or eventually periodic (i.e., periodic after some initial nonperiodic segment).

The sequence T2n is a palindrome for any n. Furthermore, let qn be a word obtained by counting the ones between consecutive zeros in T2n . For instance, q1 = 2 and q2 = 2102012. Since Tn does not contain overlapping squares, the words qn are palindromic squarefree words.

The Thue–Morse morphism μ is defined on alphabet {0,1} by the substitution map μ(0) = 01, μ(1) = 10: every 0 in a sequence is replaced with 01 and every 1 with 10. If T is the Thue–Morse sequence, then μ(T) is also T. Thus, T is a fixed point of μ. The morphism μ is a prolongable morphism on the free monoid {0,1}∗ with T as fixed point: T is essentially the only fixed point of μ; the only other fixed point is the bitwise negation of T, which is simply the Thue–Morse sequence on (1,0) instead of on (0,1). This property may be generalized to the concept of an automatic sequence.

The generating series of T over the binary field is the formal power series

This power series is algebraic over the field of rational functions, satisfying the equation

In combinatorial game theory 
The set of evil numbers (numbers  with ) forms a subspace of the nonnegative integers under nim-addition (bitwise exclusive or).  For the game of Kayles, evil nim-values occur for few (finitely many) positions in the game, with all remaining positions having odious nim-values.

The Prouhet–Tarry–Escott problem  
The Prouhet–Tarry–Escott problem can be defined as: given a positive integer N and a non-negative integer k, partition the set S = { 0, 1, ..., N-1 } into two disjoint subsets S0 and S1 that have equal sums of powers up to k, that is:
 for all integers i from 1 to k.

This has a solution if N is a multiple of 2k+1, given by:
 S0 consists of the integers n in S for which tn = 0,
 S1 consists of the integers n in S for which tn = 1.

For example, for N = 8 and k = 2,

The condition requiring that N be a multiple of 2k+1 is not strictly necessary: there are some further cases for which a solution exists. However, it guarantees a stronger property: if the condition is satisfied, then the set of kth powers of any set of N numbers in arithmetic progression can be partitioned into two sets with equal sums. This follows directly from the expansion given by the binomial theorem applied to the binomial representing the nth element of an arithmetic progression.

For generalizations of the Thue–Morse sequence and the Prouhet–Tarry–Escott problem to partitions into more than two parts, see Bolker, Offner, Richman and Zara, "The Prouhet–Tarry–Escott problem and generalized Thue–Morse sequences".

Fractals and turtle graphics 
Using turtle graphics, a curve can be generated if an automaton is programmed with a sequence.
When Thue–Morse sequence members are used in order to select program states:

 If t(n) = 0, move ahead by one unit,
 If t(n) = 1, rotate by an angle of π/3 radians (60°)

The resulting curve converges to the Koch curve, a fractal curve of
infinite length containing a finite area. This illustrates the fractal nature of the Thue–Morse Sequence.

It is also possible to draw the curve precisely using the following instructions:

If t(n) = 0, rotate by an angle of π radians (180°),
 If t(n) = 1, move ahead by one unit, then rotate by an angle of π/3 radians.

Equitable sequencing
In their book on the problem of fair division, Steven Brams and Alan Taylor invoked the Thue–Morse sequence but did not identify it as such.  When allocating a contested pile of items between two parties who agree on the items' relative values, Brams and Taylor suggested a method they called balanced alternation, or taking turns taking turns taking turns . . . , as a way to circumvent the favoritism inherent when one party chooses before the other.  An example showed how a divorcing couple might reach a fair settlement in the distribution of jointly-owned items.  The parties would take turns to be the first chooser at different points in the selection process:  Ann chooses one item, then Ben does, then Ben chooses one item, then Ann does.

Lionel Levine and Katherine E. Stange, in their discussion of how to fairly apportion a shared meal such as an Ethiopian dinner, proposed the Thue–Morse sequence as a way to reduce the advantage of moving first.  They suggested that “it would be interesting to quantify the intuition that the Thue–Morse order tends to produce a fair outcome.”

Robert Richman addressed this problem, but he too did not identify the Thue–Morse sequence as such at the time of publication.   He presented the sequences Tn as step functions on the interval [0,1] and described their relationship to the Walsh and Rademacher functions.  He showed that the nth derivative can be expressed in terms of  Tn.  As a consequence, the step function arising from  Tn is orthogonal to polynomials of order n − 1.  A consequence of this result is that a resource whose value is expressed as a monotonically decreasing continuous function is most fairly allocated using a sequence that converges to Thue–Morse as the function becomes flatter.  An example showed how to pour cups of coffee of equal strength from a carafe with a nonlinear concentration gradient, prompting a whimsical article in the popular press.

Joshua Cooper and Aaron Dutle showed why the Thue–Morse order provides a fair outcome for discrete events.  They considered the fairest way to stage a Galois duel, in which each of the shooters has equally poor shooting skills.  Cooper and Dutle postulated that each dueler would demand a chance to fire as soon as the other's a priori probability of winning exceeded their own.  They proved that, as the duelers’ hitting probability approaches zero, the firing sequence converges to the Thue–Morse sequence.  In so doing, they demonstrated that the Thue–Morse order produces a fair outcome not only for sequences Tn of length 2n, but for sequences of any length.

Thus the mathematics supports using the Thue–Morse sequence instead of alternating turns when the goal is fairness but earlier turns differ monotonically from later turns in some meaningful quality, whether that quality varies continuously or discretely.

Sports competitions form an important class of equitable sequencing problems, because strict alternation often gives an unfair advantage to one team. Ignacio Palacios-Huerta proposed changing the sequential order to Thue–Morse to improve the ex post fairness of various tournament competitions, such as the kicking sequence of a penalty shoot-out in soccer. He did a set of field experiments with pro players and found that the team kicking first won 60% of games using ABAB (or T1), 54% using ABBA (or T2), and 51% using full Thue–Morse (or Tn).  As a result, ABBA is undergoing extensive trials in FIFA (European and World Championships) and English Federation professional soccer (EFL Cup). An ABBA serving pattern has also been found to improve the fairness of tennis tie-breaks. In competitive rowing, T2 is the only arrangement of port- and starboard-rowing crew members that eliminates transverse forces (and hence sideways wiggle) on a four-membered coxless racing boat, while T3 is one of only four rigs  to avoid wiggle on an eight-membered boat.

Fairness is especially important in player drafts. Many professional sports leagues attempt to achieve competitive parity by giving earlier selections in each round to weaker teams. By contrast, fantasy football leagues have no pre-existing imbalance to correct, so they often use a “snake” draft (forward, backward, etc.; or T1). Ian Allan argued that a “third-round reversal” (forward, backward, backward, forward, etc.; or T2) would be even more fair. Richman suggested that the fairest way for “captain A” and “captain B” to choose sides for a pick-up game of basketball mirrors  T3:  captain A has the first, fourth, sixth, and seventh choices, while captain B has the second, third, fifth, and eighth choices.

Hash collisions 
The initial  bits of the Thue–Morse sequence are mapped to 0 by a wide class of polynomial hash functions modulo a power of two, which can lead to hash collisions.

History 
However, Prouhet did not mention the sequence explicitly; this was left to Axel Thue in 1906, who used it to found the study of combinatorics on words.
The sequence was only brought to worldwide attention with the work of Marston Morse in 1921, when he applied it to differential geometry.
The sequence has been discovered independently many times, not always by professional research mathematicians; for example, Max Euwe, a chess grandmaster and mathematics teacher, discovered it in 1929 in an application to chess: by using its cube-free property (see above), he showed how to circumvent the threefold repetition rule aimed at preventing infinitely protracted games by declaring repetition of moves a draw.  At the time, consecutive identical board states were required to trigger the rule; the rule was later amended to the same board position reoccurring three times at any point, as the sequence shows that the consecutive criterion can be evaded forever.

See also
 Dejean's theorem
 Fabius function
 Gray code
 Komornik–Loreti constant
 Prouhet–Thue–Morse constant

Notes

References

 
 
 
 
 
 
 }

Further reading

External links 

 
 
 Allouche, J.-P.; Shallit, J. O. The Ubiquitous Prouhet-Thue-Morse Sequence. (contains many applications and some history)
 Thue–Morse Sequence over (1,2) 
 
 
 Reducing the influence of DC offset drift in analog IPs using the Thue-Morse Sequence. A technical application of the Thue–Morse Sequence
 MusiNum - The Music in the Numbers. Freeware to generate self-similar music based on the Thue–Morse Sequence and related number sequences.
 

Binary sequences
Fixed points (mathematics)
Parity (mathematics)